is a railway station on the Keikyu Main Line in Shinagawa, Tokyo, Japan, operated by the private railway operator Keikyu. It has the station number "KK05".

Lines
Samezu Station is served by the Keikyu Main Line.

Station layout
Samezu Station is an elevated station with a single island platform serving two tracks.

Platforms

History
Samezu station opened on 8 May 1904.

Keikyu introduced station numbering to its stations on 21 October 2010; Samezu was assigned station number KK05.

References

External links

  

Railway stations in Tokyo
Railway stations in Japan opened in 1904